Leaving for Maui was a hit in Canada and Hawaii for Edmonton cabaret band Footloose in 1979.

Background
Footloose were a college band that had been around for around 18 months. This was their first release. Six months after it was released it got to the top ten in Canada. In addition to making the top of the Canadian music charts, it was also one of the most requested songs of the year in Hawaii.
  The light disco rock single brought the group had big success.

It was a Record World Single Pick for the week ending December 8, 1979. The reviewer noted the smooth pop vocals and classy arrangements and drew a comparison with an early Hall & Oates.

Airplay
For the week ending September 8, 1979, the record was getting played on Keith James' show at CHED Edmonton, Rosalie Trombley's show at CKLW Windsor, and Don Stevens' show at CKLG Vancouver. It was also a chart at CKY Winnipeg.

Chart
The song made the Canadian Top 10, and stayed in the charts for six weeks.

Along with the group's other single, "The Time Is Right", "Leaving for Maui" charted again in 1981 on Toronto station, CFTR.

Releases

Further reading
 Edmonton Journal, Nov 05, 2014 - Nov. 5, 1979: Leaving for Maui an international hit (with video) - Chris Zdeb

References

External links
 'Footloose' The Band, Edmonton Alberta Canada on "Any Way You Want It" television program
 HeRMIS PR2011.0031/4855

Hilltak Records singles
1979 singles